Trapped Ashes is a 2006 American horror anthology film with segments directed by Sean S. Cunningham, Joe Dante, Monte Hellman, Ken Russell, and John Gaeta. It stars Jayce Bartok, Henry Gibson, and Lara Harris.

Plot

"Wraparound" (Joe Dante)
In the frame story seven strangers visiting Hollywood movie studios are brought to an ill-famed House of Horror by Desmond the tour guide (Henry Gibson) and find themselves locked inside. To leave the trap alive, they have to tell their most terrifying stories.

"The Girl with Golden Breasts" (Ken Russell)
Phoebe (Rachel Veltri) receives breast implants made of reconstituted human corpse tissue but the implants exhibit an appetite for human blood.

"Jibaku" (Sean S. Cunningham)
Henry (Scott Lowell) and Julia (Lara Harris) visit Japan, where Julia is seduced by a spirit attempting to draw her into Jigoku.

"Stanley's Girlfriend" (Monte Hellman)
Leo (Tahmoh Penikett) has an affair with fellow filmmaker Stanley's (Tygh Runyan) girlfriend Nina (Amelia Cooke), a witch who drinks the blood of her lovers to gain immortality.

"My Twin, the Worm" (John Gaeta)
Natalie's mother Martine (Michèle-Barbara Pelletier) cannot treat her tapeworm without losing her unborn child and must allow them both to grow inside her. Once born, Natalie continues to be compelled to feed the worm.

Cast
 Jayce Bartok as Andy
 Henry Gibson as Tour Guide
 Lara Harris as Julia
 Scott Lowell as Henry
 Dick Miller as Max
 Rachel Veltri as Phoebe
 Michèle-Barbara Pelletier as Nathalie / Martine
Matreya Fedor as Young Nathalie
 John Saxon as Leo
Tahmoh Penikett as Young Leo
 Andy Maton as Stanley
Tygh Runyan as Young Stanley
 Yoshinori Hiruma as Seishin
 Amelia Cooke as Nina
 Ryo Ishibashi as Head Monk
 Luke Macfarlane as Vincent
 Richard Ian Cox as Doug
 Ken Russell as Dr. Lucy
 Deanna Milligan as Annie
 Jerry Wasserman as Dr. Stengel

Reception 
The film received a 33% approval rating on a Rotten Tomatoes review (average rating 4.3/10).

References

External links 
 
  
 

2006 films
2006 horror films
American supernatural horror films
American horror anthology films
Films directed by Sean S. Cunningham
Films directed by Ken Russell
Films directed by Joe Dante
Films directed by Monte Hellman
Films set in Japan
Films set in Los Angeles
Japan in non-Japanese culture
2000s English-language films
2000s American films
Films about worms